Clementina Elizabeth Drummond-Willoughby, 24th Baroness Willoughby de Eresby (2 September 1809, London – 13 November 1888, Grimsthorpe Castle) was a suo jure British baroness.  She was the daughter of Peter Robert Drummond-Burrell, 22nd Baron Willoughby de Eresby (died 1865) and Sarah Clementina, née Drummond (died 1865). On the death of her brother, Albyric Drummond-Willoughby, 23rd Baron Willoughby de Eresby, in 1871, the Barony of Willoughby de Eresby fell into abeyance between her sister, Charlotte, and her. On 13 November 1871, the abeyance of the barony was terminated in her favour.

She was born and baptised with the name of Clementina Elizabeth Burrell-Drummond. And on 4 May 1872, her name was changed to Clementina Elizabeth Heathcote-Drummond-Willoughby by Royal Licence.

She married Sir Gilbert John Heathcote, 1st Baron Aveland on 8 October 1827 in Drummond Castle. They became parents of:
Gilbert Heathcote-Drummond-Willoughby, 1st Earl of Ancaster, who succeeded her in the Barony of Willoughby de Eresby and his father in the Barony of Aveland, and
Clementia Heathcote (died 1922), who married Vice-Admiral Sir George Tryon (1832–1893) in 1869 and became mother of the 1st Baron Tryon.

She was also Joint (1/4) Hereditary Lord Great Chamberlain from 1870 to her death.

She was buried at St Matthew's Church, Normanton, Rutland.

|-

References

24
1809 births
1888 deaths
Clementina
Clementina
Aveland
Hereditary women peers